is a railway station on the Hokuriku Main Line in the city of Hakusan, Ishikawa, Japan, operated by West Japan Railway Company (JR West).

Lines

Station layout
The station consists of one side platform and one island platform connected by an elevated station building. The station is unmanned.

Platforms

Adjacent stations

History
Mikawa Station opened on 1 April 1898. With the privatization of Japanese National Railways (JNR) on 1 April 1987, the station came under the control of JR West.

Passenger statistics
In fiscal 2015, the station was used by an average of 840 passengers daily (boarding passengers only).

Surrounding area
Tedori River
Mikawa Post Office
Mikawa Elementary School
Mikawa Junior High School
Mikawa onsen

See also
 List of railway stations in Japan

References

External links

  

Stations of West Japan Railway Company
Railway stations in Ishikawa Prefecture
Railway stations in Japan opened in 1898
Hokuriku Main Line
Hakusan, Ishikawa